Mirsad Brunčević (born 11 June 1994) is a Serbian football defender, playing for FK Tutin.

Club career
After youth categories he passed with Novi Pazar and Partizan, Brunčević signed for Hellas Verona. Later, he had been loaned to Proleter Novi Sad for the 2012–13 season. He returned in Verona after that season, but after he missed some period because of injury, he was loaned to Udinese Calcio in 2014, for a year. Brunčević returned in his home club Novi Pazar for the 2015–16 season.

Brunčević joined FK Tutin in the summer 2019.

Career statistics

Club

References

External links
 
 

1994 births
Living people
Sportspeople from Novi Pazar
Association football defenders
Serbian footballers
Serbian expatriate footballers
Serbian expatriate sportspeople in Italy
Expatriate footballers in Italy
Hellas Verona F.C. players
FK Proleter Novi Sad players
Udinese Calcio players
FK Novi Pazar players
Serbian SuperLiga players